The Blue Shrimp is a restaurant in Puerto Vallarta, in the Mexican state of Jalisco.

Description

In her 2020 Moon guide for Puerto Vallarta, Madeline Milne describes The Blue Shrimp as a "sophisticated palapa-style restaurant with beautiful natural decor". The interior features "relics of ancient ships" and walls resembling reefs. Aquariums and blue lights also contribute to the nautical theme. The bathrooms are shaped like shells. In addition to shrimp, the menu features fish (including mahi mahi and tuna) and a salad bar.

History
The restaurant was established in 1999 and originally located on Morelos street. It relocated to Playa de los Muertos in 2010.

See also

 List of restaurants in Mexico
 List of seafood restaurants

References

External links

 
 The Blue Shrimp Restaurant at Vallarta Lifestyles

1999 establishments in Mexico
Restaurants established in 1999
Restaurants in Jalisco
Seafood restaurants in Mexico
Zona Romántica